Jalan Terachi-Seri Menanti (Negeri Sembilan state route N29) is a major road in Negeri Sembilan, Malaysia. It is also one of two main routes to Seri Menanti royal town from Seremban, the other being Jalan Tanjung Ipoh-Senaling . However, this route is the shorter route to Seri Menanti and therefore is more popular for people visiting the royal town. This road is also home to the Royal Seri Menanti Golf & Country Club.

List of junctions

Roads in Negeri Sembilan